The 1948 Winter Olympics, officially known by the International Olympic Committee as the V Olympic Winter Games, were a multi-sport event held in St. Moritz, Switzerland, from January 30 through February 8, 1948. A total of 669 athletes representing 28 National Olympic Committees (NOCs) participated at the Games in twenty two events across eight disciplines.

The Olympic programme was adjusted from that of the 1936 Winter Olympics with the addition of skeleton for men. The sport had first appeared at the 1928 Winter Olympics, which had also taken place in St. Moritz, but would not make another appearance until 2002 in Salt Lake City. Two demonstration sports were held in St. Moritz, winter pentathlon and military patrol. This was the fourth time military patrol had been held as a demonstration event, the closely related sport of biathlon was added to the programme beginning with the 1960 Squaw Valley Olympics. Both men and women competed in the 1948 Games, with women taking part in alpine skiing and figure skating.

A total of 123 athletes won medals at the 1948 Games. Norway, Sweden and Switzerland tied for the most number of medals, with ten each. The United States placed fourth in the medal count, with nine, and Austria placed fifth, with eight. Of the 28 competing NOCs, 13 won at least one medal, with 10 of these winning at least one gold. Notable absences from these Games were defeated Axis Powers members Germany and Japan, who were not invited to St. Moritz or the London Summer Olympics later in the year in light of the recently concluded World War II.   The Soviet Union, who did not form an NOC until 1951, declined to take part.

Sweden repeated its success in cross-country skiing, winning all three medals in the Men's 18 km event and all three gold medals available in the sport. Canadian teenager Barbara-Ann Scott became the first from her nation to win an Olympic gold medal in figure skating, and Dick Button from the United States did the same. Alpine skier Henri Oreiller from France won the most medals with a total of three, with two gold medals from the downhill and combined events, and a bronze in the slalom event.

Alpine skiing

Bobsleigh

Cross-country skiing

Figure skating

Ice hockey

Nordic combined

Skeleton

Ski jumping

Speed skating

Multiple medallists 
Athletes who won more than one medal are listed below.

See also
1948 Winter Olympics medal table

References

External links

Medal winners
Lists of Winter Olympic medalists by year
Switzerland sport-related lists